Manierre Dawson (December 22, 1887- August 15, 1969) was an abstract American painter and sculptor.

Personal life
Dawson was born and raised in Chicago, Illinois, but lived most of his life in Michigan. He was the second of four sons born to George E. Dawson and Eva (Manierre) Dawson who, despite supporting art as an avocation, preferred "professional" careers for their sons. His younger brother, Mitchell Dawson, was an attorney and poet.

Early career
After completing high school, Manierre enrolled in the civil engineering program at the Armour Institute of Technology.  When he completed his four-year degree in 1909, his civil engineering curriculum had made a lasting impact on his creative vision.  Mechanical drawing methods and descriptive geometry courses led him to paint in a geometric style by the end of 1908.  His analytic geometry and differential calculus courses contributed directly to his first series of abstract paintings in the spring of 1910. (Ploog, Bairstow and Boyajian, Manierre Dawson (1887–1969): A Catalogue Raisonné, 2011)  At that time, he was a first-year employee at the Chicago architectural firm of John Holabird and Martin Roche.
After a year with the firm, he was granted a six-month leave of absence for an educational tour of Europe.  He departed in mid-June 1910 for his only trip abroad.  His itinerary is well documented in his journal.  Disembarking in Liverpool, he made his way across England to France, south through Germany, across Switzerland to Italy, back north for a second stay in Paris, and around northern Germany before embarking from Bremerhaven in late-November.  In Siena, he met and exchanged ideas on painting with John Singer Sargent.  During his return visit to Paris he attended a Saturday evening soiree at the apartment of Gertrude Stein, and he saw paintings by Paul Cézanne in the gallery of Ambrose Vollard.  Returning through Hoboken, he stopped in New York to call upon Arthur B. Davies who introduced him to Albert Pinkham Ryder  (Ploog, "The First American Abstractionist: Manierre Dawson and his Sources," in Manierre Dawson: An American Pioneer of Abstract Art, Hollis Taggart Galleries, 1999).

Mid career
Fueled by his tour of Europe and meeting Davies, 1911 through 1914 were the most productive years of his career.  He produced some paintings based on old master compositions. (Mary Mathews Gedo, "Modernizing the Masters: Manierre Dawson's Cubist Transliterations," Arts Magazine, April 1981).  In December 1912, Davies invited Dawson to participate in the International Exhibition of Modern Art (better known as the Armory Show) in New York (Feb. 15-Mar. 15, 1913) but Dawson declined, lamenting that he had nothing appropriate to send.  When the exhibition came to Chicago (Mar. 24-Apr. 15, 1913), he met Walter Pach and bought two paintings: Marcel Duchamp's Nu (esquisse) (Nude [study]) now known as Jeune homme triste dans un train (Sad Young Man on a Train) and [Amadéo de Souza Cardoso]'s Return from the Chase.  While the Armory Show still hung in the Art Institute of Chicago, Dawson's employment with Holabird and Roche ended.  The circumstances of his termination are not known.
In 1914, Dawson participated in two group exhibitions.  One organized by Davies and Pach in conjunction with the Montross Gallery in New York traveled to the Detroit Museum of Art, the Cincinnati Museum of Art, and the Peabody Institute in Baltimore.  The other organized by the Milwaukee Art Society (now the Milwaukee Art Museum) resulted in the sale of two paintings to Arthur Jerome Eddy.
Summers spent at the family's retreat in southern Mason County, Michigan, near Ludington, were his most productive periods during his early career and provided rudimentary knowledge of growing and marketing fruit. So, in the fall of 1914, he moved there permanently.  He met Lilian Boucher, the daughter of a local farmer, and fell in love.  They married in July 1915, and three children were born over the next five years.

Later career
Just as the impact of his civil engineering training is evident in his early work, the events of his life and his profession influenced his art later in his career.  When he began to make a living from the land and started a family, fertility appeared as the theme of some of his works.  Likewise, the long hours in his orchards, pruning, spraying, and harvesting resulted in compositions consisting of intertwining limbs.  Conceived as sculptures but recorded as paintings in the late teens, some were later realized in three dimensions.  Living in rural Michigan and struggling financially he made art from what was available (Portland cement, scraps of lumber, pieces of plywood).  Sheets of composite wood (brand names Novoply and Timblend) were laminated together for thickness and carved into freestanding sculptures.
In the mid-1950s he and his wife began wintering in Sarasota, Florida.  The first real recognition of his work began in 1966 with a retrospective exhibition mounted by the Grand Rapids Art Museum.  An exhibition organized by the John and Mable Ringing Museum in Sarasota and shared with the Norton Museum of Art in West Palm Springs followed a year later.  This exhibition brought Dawson to the attention of Robert Schoelkopf who showed his work in New York in April 1969 and March 1981.
When Dawson was diagnosed with cancer in 1968, he sold the Michigan farm and moved to Sarasota permanently.  He died on August 15, 1969.

Major paintings
 Promrs. darrow gnostic, 1910, Milwaukee Museum of Art
 Xdx, 1910, Brooklyn Museum of Art
 Discal Procession, 1910, Smithsonian American Art Museum, Washington, DC
 Lucrece, 1911, The John and Mable Ringling Museum of Art, Sarasota
 Mrs. Darrow, 1911, Art Institute of Chicago
 Meeting (The Three Graces), 1912, Metropolitan Museum of Art, New York
 Figures in Action (Struggle), 1912, Virginia Museum of Fine Arts, Richmond
 Retrospect, 1913, The Museum of Modern Art, New York
 Letters and Numbers, 1914, Hirshhorn Museum and Sculpture Garden, Smithsonian Institution, Washington, DC
 Figure by Window, 1915, Illinois State Museum, Springfield

Selected exhibitions
 Exhibition of Paintings and Drawings, Montross Gallery in New York, February 2–23, 1914; the Detroit Museum of Art, Mar. 1-14, 1914; Cincinnati Museum of Art, March 19–April 5, 1914; and the Peabody Institute, Baltimore, Apr. 15–May 15, 1914.
 Manierre Dawson, Milwaukee Art Institute, Jan. 1923.
 Retrospective Paintings by Manierre Dawson, Grand Rapids Art Museum, Michigan, April 3–24, 1966.
 Manierre Dawson: Paintings 1909-1913, Ringling Museum of Art, Sarasota, Florida November 6–26, 1967, Norton Gallery and School of Art, West Palm Beach, Florida, January 6-February 18, 1968.
 Manierre Dawson, Robert Schoelkopf Gallery, New York, April 5-May 1, 1969.
 Manierre Dawson (1887-1969): A Retrospective Exhibition of Painting, Museum of Contemporary Art, Chicago, November 13-January 2, 1977. Indiana University Art Museum, Bloomington, January 18-February 20, 1977; Maryland Art Gallery, University of Maryland, College Park, March 29-May 1, 1977.
 Manierre Dawson, Paintings 1910-1914, Robert Schoelkopf Gallery, New York, March 28-April 22, 1981.
 Manierre Dawson (1887-1969): American Modernist Painter, Tildon-Foley Gallery, New Orleans, May 21-June 30, 1988.
 Manierrre Dawson Early Abstractionist, Whitney Museum of American Art, New York, July 8-June 30, 1988.
 Manierre Dawson American Pioneer of Abstract Art, Hollis Taggart Galleries, New York, October 1–30, 1999.
 Manierre Dawson American Pioneer of Abstract Art, Swope Art Museum, Terre Haute, Indiana, December 1–30, 2000.
 Manierre Dawson: New Revelations, Hollis Taggart Galleries, Chicago, May 1-June 15, 2003.
 Manierre Dawson: A Startling Presence, Illinois State Museum, Springfield, March 12–August 6, 2006.
 Manierre Dawson (1887–1969), Hollis Taggart Galleries, New York, April 7–30, 2011.

Selected bibliography
 Ploog, Randy J., Myra Bairstow, and Ani Boyajian, Manierre Dawson (1887-1969): A Catalogue Raisonne (The Three Graces in association with Hollis Taggart Galleries, New York, 2011).
Bluhm, Sharon K.,"Manierre Dawson: Inventions of the Mind," Ludington, Michigan: Humps Hollow Historical Press, 2012.
 Hey, Kenneth R., "Manierre Dawson: A Fix on the Phantoms of the Imagination," Archives of American Art Journal 14, no. 4 (1974), pp. 7–12.
 Davidson, Abraham, A. "Two from the Second Decade: Manierre Dawson and John Covert," Art in America 63, no. 5 (Sept. 1975), pp. 50–55.
 Powell, Earl A. III, "Manierre Dawson's 'Woman in Brown,'" Arts Magazine 51, no. 1 (Sept. 1976), pp. 76–77.
 Gedo, Mary M. "Manierre Dawson: The Prophet in His Own Country," American Art Review 4, no. 3 (Dec. 1977), pp. 64–75, 121-125.
 Gedo, Mary Mathews, "Modernizing the Master: Manierre Dawson's Cubist Transliterations," Art Magazine 55, no. 8 (April 1981), pp. 135–145.
 Adams, Henry and Randy J. Ploog, Manierre Dawson American Pioneer of Abstract Art (New York: Hollis Taggart Galleries, 1999).
 Ploog, Randy J. and Henry Adams, Manierre Dawson: New Revelations (Chicago: Hollis Taggart Galleries, 2003).
 Bates, Geoffrey, "Manierre Dawson: An Artist Out of Bounds," The Living Museum, 68, no. 1 (2006) pp. 8–13.

References

Further reading
 Davidson, Abraham A. Early American Modernist Painting, 1910-1935, (New York: Harper and Row, 1981).
 Prince, Sue A. ed. The Old Guard and the Avant-Garde: Modernism in Chicago, 1910-1940 (Chicago: University of Chicago Press, 1990).
 Kennedy, Elizabeth ed. Chicago Modern, 1893-1945: Pursuit of the New, (Chicago: Terra Museum of American Art, 2004).

External links
 Manierre Dawson Catalogue Raisonné
 Manierre Dawson, an American Kandinsky, New York Times.
 Manierre Dawson: A Pioneer, Illinois State University.

1887 births
1969 deaths
20th-century American painters
American male painters
20th-century American male artists